Gyrovagues (sometimes Gyrovagi or Gyruvagi) were wandering or itinerant monks without fixed residence or leadership, who relied on charity and the hospitality of others.

The term, coming from French, itself from Late Latin gyrovagus (gyro-, "circle" and vagus, "wandering"), is used to refer to a kind of monk, rather than a specific order, and may be pejorative as they are almost universally denounced by Christian writers of the Early Middle Ages. The Council of Chalcedon (451) and Second Council of Nicaea (787) prohibit this practice. The "gyrovagi" were denounced as wretched by Benedict of Nursia, who accused them of indulging their passions and cravings. Augustine called them Circumcelliones (circum cellas = those who prowl around the barns) and attributed the selling of fake relics as their innovation. Cassian also mentions a class of monk, which may have been identical, who were reputed to be gluttons who refused to fast at the proper times.

Background
Up until the time of Benedict, several attempts had been made by various synods at suppressing and disciplining monks who refused to settle in a cloister.  With the establishment of the Rule of St. Benedict in the 8th century, the cenobitic and eremitic forms of monasticism became the accepted form of monasticism within the Christian Church, and the wandering monk phenomenon faded into obscurity.

As with the term Sarabaites, after the eighth century the term Gyrovagi was sometimes used pejoratively to refer to degenerate monks within a monastery, or to travelling salesmen.

In the early 13th century, some of the first Friars Preachers of the Dominican order were dismissed as gyrovagues, and their active preaching dismissed as beneath the dignity of the serious religious who lived in monasteries.

In Defence of the Mendicants, the Flemish Dominican Thomas of Cantimpré wrote:
Well, my brethren, you need not be ashamed to be called or to be gyrovagues. You are in the company of St. Paul, the teacher of the nations...While they [the monks] sit in their monasteries...you go touring round with Paul, doing the job you have been given to do.

See also
 Friar
 Mendicant orders
 Sarabaites
 Rule of St. Benedict
 The New Schaff-Herzog Encyclopedia of Religious Knowledge

References

Itinerant living
Christian monasticism